Margarete "Grete" Lihotzky (born 23 January 1897 in the Margareten district of Vienna, Austria-Hungary – 18 January 2000) was an  Austrian architect and a communist activist in the Austrian resistance to Nazism. She is mostly remembered today for designing what is known as the Frankfurt kitchen.

Early life and education 
Margarete Lihotzky was born on 23 January 1897 into a bourgeois family in Margareten, since 1850 part of Vienna. Her grandfather Gustav Lihotzky was a mayor of Czernowitz, Ducal Bukovina, and her mother Julie Bode was relative of Wilhelm von Bode. Her father was a liberal-minded civil servant, Erwin Lihotzky, whose pacifism made him welcome the end of the Habsburg Empire and the founding of the republic in 1918. Lihotzky became the first female student at the Kunstgewerbeschule, today the University of Applied Arts Vienna), where renowned artists such as Josef Hoffmann, Anton Hanak, and Oskar Kokoschka taught. Lihotzky almost did not get in. Her mother persuaded a close friend to ask the famous artist Gustav Klimt for a letter of recommendation. In 1997, celebrating her 100th birthday and reminiscing about her decision to study architecture, she remarked that "in 1916 no one would have conceived of a woman being commissioned to build a house – not even myself."

Lihotzky studied architecture under Oskar Strnad, winning prizes for her designs even before her graduation. Strnad was one of the pioneers of sozialer Wohnbau in Vienna, affordable yet comfortable social housing for the working classes. Inspired by him, Lihotzky understood that connecting design to functionality was the new trend that would be in demand in the future. After graduating, among her other projects, she collaborated with Adolf Loos, planning settlements for World War I invalids and veterans. During this time she also worked alongside architect Josef Frank and philosopher Otto Neurath in the context of the newly founded Austrian Settlement and Allotment Garden Association where she developed core houses. Her memories of these and many other Austrian architects and intellectuals are collected in her book Warum ich Architektin wurde ('Why I Became an Architect').

Housing design

In 1926 she was called to the Hochbauamt of the City Council of Frankfurt am Main, Germany, by the architect and city planner Ernst May where she worked on the New Frankfurt project.  May had been given the political power and financial resources to solve Frankfurt's housing shortage.  He and Schütte-Lihotzky, together with the rest of May's assembled architectural staff, successfully brought functional clarity and humanitarian values to thousands of the city's housing units.

Lihotzky continued her work by designing kindergartens, students' homes, schools and similar community buildings. Schütte-Lihotzky designed kindergarten pavilions based on the ideas of Maria Montessori. In Frankfurt she met colleague Wilhelm Schütte, whom she married the following year.

Frankfurt Kitchen 

As part of the New Frankfurt-project Lihotzky created the Frankfurt Kitchen in 1926, which was the prototype of the built-in kitchen now prevalent in the Western world. Based on scientific research by U.S. management expert Frederick Winslow Taylor and her own research, Lihotzky used a railroad dining car kitchen as her model to design a "housewife's laboratory" using a minimum of space but offering a maximum of comfort and equipment. The kitchen measured just 1.9 x 3.4 meters. Kitchen surfaces were painted blue-green as scientists claimed the color repelled flies. The Frankfurt City Council eventually installed 10,000 of her mass-produced, prefabricated kitchens in newly-built working-class apartments.

On her 100th birthday Schütte-Lihotzky commented "You'll be surprised that, before I conceived the Frankfurt Kitchen in 1926, I never cooked myself. At home in Vienna my mother cooked, in Frankfurt I went to the Wirthaus [restaurant-pub]. I designed the kitchen as an architect, not as a housewife."

Wartime activities 
As the political situation in the Weimar Republic deteriorated and shifted to the political right, Schütte-Lihotzky joined a team of seventeen architects, the "May Brigade", led by architect Ernst May and including her husband and Erich Mauthner, also from Vienna. In 1930 they travelled to Moscow by train. There the group was commissioned to help realize the first of Stalin's five-year plans by building the industrial city of Magnitogorsk in the southern Ural Mountains. On their arrival, the city consisted of mud huts and barracks. It was to have 200,000 inhabitants in a few years' time, the majority the populace working in the steel industry. Although the May Brigade was credited with the construction of 20 cities in three years, political conditions were bad and the results mixed. May left Russia in 1933 when his contract was up.

With the exception of brief business trips and lecture tours to Japan and China, Schütte-Lihotzky remained in the Soviet Union until 1937. She and her husband moved first to London and later to Paris. Also, in 1933 Schütte-Lihotzky had presented some of her work at the Chicago world's fair, "Century of Progress".

In 1938 Schütte-Lihotzky, together with her husband, was called to Istanbul, Turkey, to teach at the Academy of Fine Arts, and to reunite with exiled German architect Bruno Taut. (Unfortunately Taut died soon after their arrival.) On the eve of World War II Istanbul was a haven for exiled Europeans, a common destination for exiled Germans, and the Schüttes encountered artists such as the musicians Béla Bartók and Paul Hindemith.

In Istanbul Schütte-Lihotzky met fellow Austrian Herbert Eichholzer, an architect who at the time was busy organizing Communist resistance to the Nazi regime. In 1939 Schütte-Lihotzky joined the Austrian Communist Party (KPÖ) and in December 1940, of her own free will, together with Eichholzer, travelled back to Vienna to secretly contact the Austrian communist resistance movement. Schütte-Lihotzky agreed to meet a leading Resistance member nicknamed "Gerber", Erwin Puschmann, and help set up a communications line with Istanbul. She met "Gerber" at the Cafe Viktoria on 22 January 1941, where they were surprised and arrested by the Gestapo, only 25 days after her arrival.  While Eichholzer and other resistance fighters, who had also been seized, were charged with high treason, sentenced to death by the Volksgerichtshof and executed in 1943, Schütte-Lihotzky was sentenced to 15 years of imprisonment and taken to a prison in Aichach, Bavaria. She was liberated by U.S. troops on 29 April 1945.

Post-war

After the war, she went to work in Sofia, Bulgaria, eventually returning to her native Vienna in 1947. Her strong political views – she remained a communist – prevented her from receiving any major public commissions in post-war Austria, despite the fact that innumerable buildings had been destroyed and had to be rebuilt (Wiederaufbau). Consequently, apart from designing some private homes, Schütte-Lihotzky worked as a consultant in China, Cuba, and the German Democratic Republic. In 1951 she separated from her husband, Wilhelm Schütte.

Belatedly, her accomplishments were officially recognized in Austria. She was first recognised for her non-architecture activities: in 1977 she received a medal for her peace work and, in 1978, an honour badge for her work in the Resistance. She received the Architecture Award from the City of Vienna in 1980. In 1985 she published her memoirs, Erinnerungen aus dem Widerstand ('Memories From the Resistance'). She refused to be honoured in 1988 by Austrian Federal President Kurt Waldheim on the grounds of Waldheim's dubious wartime record. She eventually received the award in 1992. In 1995 she was one of a group of Austrian Holocaust survivors who sued Jörg Haider after a debate in the Austrian parliament on bomb attacks on Romanies in which Haider referred to Nazi concentration camps as "prison camps".

In 1990 a scale model of the Frankfurt Kitchen was put on display in the Austrian Museum for Applied Art in Vienna.

She celebrated her 100th birthday in 1997, dancing a short waltz with the Mayor of Vienna and remarking, "I would have enjoyed it, for a change, to design a house for a rich man."

Margarete Schütte-Lihotzky died in Vienna, on 18 January 2000, at the age of 102, five days before her 103rd birthday, of complications after contracting influenza.  She was interred in the Vienna Central Cemetery.

The Australian singer, writer, and director Robyn Archer wrote a play based on Schütte-Lihotzky's life. Architektin, featuring Helen Morse, Ksenja Logos, Craig Behenna, Duncan Graham, Antje Guenther, Michael Habib and Nick Pelomis, produced by the State Theatre Company of South Australia, and directed by Adam Cook, opened on 2 September 2008 at the Dunstan Playhouse, Adelaide, South Australia. The song "The Frankfurt Kitchen" by Rotifer is another tribute to her work.

Honours and awards
 Architecture Award of the City of Vienna (1980)  
 Austrian Decoration for Science and Art (1992)
 Grand Decoration of Honour in Gold with Star for Services to the Republic of Austria (1997)

See also 
Sotsgorod: Cities for Utopia
Women in architecture

References

Further reading
 Peter Noever, MAK (Ed.), Authors: Renate Allmayer-Beck, Susanne Baumgartner-Haindl, Marion Lindner-Gross, Christine Zwingl: Margarete Schütte-Lihotzky. Soziale Architektur - Zeitzeugin eines Jahrhunderts. Böhlau, Vienna (1996), .
 Susan R. Henderson, Building Culture: Ernst May and the New Frankfurt Initiative, 1926-1931. Peter Lang, 2013. 
 Susan R. Henderson, A Revolution in Woman’s Sphere:  Grete Lihotzky and the Frankfurt Kitchen (reprint), in Housing and Dwelling (Barbara Miller Lane, ed.). Routledge, 2006, chapter 7, 248-258. 
  Susan R. Henderson, Reputations. Grete Schütte-Lihotzky in AR. The Architectural Review (27 June 2015), 96-98.
  Susan R. Henderson, Housing the Single Woman, JSAH (2009)
  Sophie Hochhäusl, From Vienna to Frankfurt Inside Core House Type 7: A History of Scarcity through the Modern Kitchen, Architectural Histories (2013), https://journal.eahn.org/articles/10.5334/ah.aq/
 Sophie Hochhäusl, 'Dear Comrade' or Exile in a Communist World: Resistance, Feminism, and Urbanism in Margarete Schütte-Lihotzky’s Work in China, 1934/1956, Architecture Beyond Europe (2020), https://doi.org/10.4000/abe.7169
 Alfons Puigarnau, “The Woman Architect Schutze Lihotzky.” in Women's Creativity since the Modern Movement (1918-2018) Toward a New Perception and Reception (2018). 
 Marion Godau (2016): On the Organization of Products in German Design. DESIGNABILITIES Design Research Journal, (11) 2016. ISSN 2511-6274
 Berkovich, Gary. Reclaiming a History. Jewish Architects in Imperial Russia and the USSR. Volume 3. Socialist Realism: 1933–1955. Weimar und Rostock: Grunberg Verlag. 2022. P. 194. .

External links 

1897 births
2000 deaths
Austrian women architects
Austrian centenarians
Austrian communists
Housing in Germany
Austrian resistance members
Recipients of the Austrian Decoration for Science and Art
Recipients of the Grand Decoration with Star for Services to the Republic of Austria
Austrian people of German descent
People from Margareten
Burials at the Vienna Central Cemetery
20th-century Austrian architects
Women centenarians
Architects from Vienna